Chang Tong-rong (born 4 February 1949) was the mayor of Keelung City in Taiwan. He previously also served as a legislator in the Legislative Yuan of the Republic of China.

Education
Chang received his bachelor's degree in electrical engineering from China University of Science and Technology and master's degree in shipping and transportation management from National Taiwan Ocean University.

Keelung City Mayoralty
Chang was elected as the Mayor of Keelung City after winning the 2007 Keelung City Mayoralty by-election under Kuomintang on 12 May 2007 and took office on 22 May 2007 due to the death of then-incumbent Mayor Hsu Tsai-li which was elected as mayor since the 2001 Keelung City mayoralty election on 1 December 2001 and took office on 20 December 2001. He was reelected for the second term of mayor after winning the 2009 Keelung City mayoralty election on 5 December 2009 and took office on 20 December 2009.

References

1949 births
Living people
Kuomintang Members of the Legislative Yuan in Taiwan
China University of Science and Technology alumni
National Taiwan Ocean University alumni
People First Party Members of the Legislative Yuan
Politicians of the Republic of China on Taiwan from Changhua County
Mayors of Keelung
Members of the 4th Legislative Yuan
Members of the 5th Legislative Yuan
Keelung Members of the Legislative Yuan
Taiwanese people of Hoklo descent